Alexander Brassey Jonathan Scott  (16 October 1906 – 11 June 1978) was a British horse rider who competed in the 1936 Summer Olympics.

In 1936 he and his horse Bob Clive won the bronze medal as part of the British eventing team, after finishing seventh in the individual eventing competition.

Scott attended the Royal Military College, Sandhurst. In World War II, he joined the 5th Royal Inniskilling Dragoon Guards. He was awarded the Military Cross in the King's 1940 Birthday Honours.

References

External links
profile

1906 births
1978 deaths
British event riders
Olympic equestrians of Great Britain
British male equestrians
Equestrians at the 1936 Summer Olympics
Olympic bronze medallists for Great Britain
Olympic medalists in equestrian
Recipients of the Military Cross
British Army personnel of World War II
Medalists at the 1936 Summer Olympics
5th Royal Inniskilling Dragoon Guards officers
Graduates of the Royal Military College, Sandhurst